WRTT-FM (95.1 FM, "Rocket 95.1") is an American commercial radio station licensed to serve the community of Huntsville, Alabama. The station, established in 1960, is currently owned by the Black Crow Media Group and the license is held by BCA Radio LLC. Black Crow Media Group owns two other Huntsville stations, WAHR and WLOR.  Its studios are located off University Drive (U.S. 72) in Huntsville, and its transmitter is located north of the city.

Programming
WRTT-FM focuses on active rock releases since 1990, supporting various subgenres such as mainstream rock, grunge rock, and the like. More recently, though, it has begun to rotate in songs from the classic rock canon, to widen its appeal to somewhat older listeners.

After seven years in the mornings on WRTT-FM, The Rick and Bubba Show began airing on crosstown WQRV starting January 2, 2008. The syndicated hosts were replaced on WRTT-FM as of December 3, 2007, by radio personalities Jerome "Fish" Fisher and Ken Harron.

These two were replaced sometime in 2010 by "Jimbo and Casio," who currently run the morning show.

History

WHBS-FM
The 95.1 frequency was home to the first FM radio station in Huntsville as "WHBS-FM", which began broadcasting December 21, 1947. It was mainly a simulcast of WHBS (1490 AM), which was owned by The Huntsville Times. WHBS-AM moved to 1550 AM and increased power to 5,000 day/500 night watts in 1952 (it broadcast 1,000 day/250 night on 1490 AM) The FM station broadcast from a transmitter near Bankhead Parkway/Tollgate Road until around 1957 with 10,000 watts. The station had about a 150-mile coverage area with a good antenna. The AM station was sold to Smith Broadcasting in 1958 and became WAAY radio (now licensed as "WLOR".)

WNDA
On October 8, 1960, a new radio station licensed as "WNDA" began broadcasting with 3,100 watts of effective radiated power on a frequency of 92.9 megahertz. Under the ownership of Hughey Broadcasting Company, WNDA served Huntsville and surrounding communities with an easy listening music format. In 1964, the station moved to the current 95.1 MHz frequency.

On May 1, 1970, WNDA was purchased by Wells Broadcasting Company, Inc., and its format shifted from easy listening to Christian spirituals and teaching programs. The station was the first in northern Alabama to broadcast Contemporary Christian music, which eventually became WNDA's staple programming. This format would endure on WNDA for nearly 30 years. Also during much of that time, WNDA was the local home for the Texaco-sponsored Metropolitan Opera broadcasts on Saturday afternoons for years instead of public station WLRH, which would otherwise be expected to carry them due to its classical format; that station has in fact never carried the program to this day.

WRTT-FM
In January 2000, Wells Broadcasting Company, Inc. agreed to sell WNDA to a company called STG Media, LLC. The FCC approved the deal on March 7, 2000, and the transaction was consummated on May 1, 2000, exactly 30 years to the day when Wells bought WNDA. While the sale was in progress, the station's call sign was changed to "WRTT-FM". The station dropped its longtime Christian radio format in favor of a classic rock format branded as "Rocket 95.1". It eventually evolved into a modern rock playlist.

In November 2001, due to a proposed refinancing of its parent company, STG Media, LLC applied to the FCC to transfer the licenses of WAHR, WLOR, and WRTT-FM to Black Crow Media Group subsidiary BCA Media, LLC. Just two days later, another application was filed to shift the licenses to BCA Radio, LLC. The FCC approved the moves on November 15, 2001, and the consummation of the transaction occurred on November 19, 2001.

In January 2010, Black Crow Media Group and its subsidiaries filed for "Chapter 11" bankruptcy, seeking to reorganize rather than be broken up. Their filing with the FCC notified the Commission of the involuntary transfer of the license from BCA Radio, LLC, to an entity known as BCA Radio, LLC, Debtor-In-Possession.

In November 2011, Black Crow Media Group announced that it was reorganizing its radio holdings and consolidating the four subsidiaries acting as debtors in possession (including BCA Radio, LLC) into a new company named Southern Stone Communications, LLC. The FCC approved the transfer on December 19, 2011.

The station received a construction permit to boost power from 12 kW to 13.5 kW, while remaining at the same location and antenna height, in December 2016.

A license to cover for this power boost was filed in February 2017.

References

External links
Rocket 95.1 Online

RTT-FM
Active rock radio stations in the United States
Radio stations established in 1960
1960 establishments in Alabama